Radhi Ben Abdelmajid Jaïdi (born 30 August 1975) is a Tunisian former footballer who played as a centre back. He was previously head coach of the under-23 team at Southampton, head coach of USL Championship team Hartford Athletic, assistant coach at Belgian side Cercle Brugge and head coach at Espérance de Tunis.

Club career

Espérance 
Before coming to England, Jaïdi was the only player at the time to have won all four of Africa’s annual cup competitions – all with Espérance.

Bolton Wanderers 
Jaïdi signed for Bolton Wanderers on a free transfer in July 2004 from Espérance Sportive de Tunis, who won the Tunisian league title the season before. Jaïdi became the first Tunisian player to play in the Premier League with Bolton.

Birmingham City 
Jaïdi joined Birmingham City in the summer of 2006 for £2 million. He made his debut in a 1–0 win over Crystal Palace in the early stages of the season although he almost scored an own goal in this match. After three years with the club, he was not offered another deal when his contract expired at the end of June 2009.

Southampton 
In August 2009, Jaïdi passed a medical and agreed personal terms with Football League One club Southampton, but the transfer stalled when doubts arose over the player's eligibility for a work permit. However, on 2 September 2009, the club confirmed that Jaïdi had signed a two-year contract, subject to work-permit clearance. He received his international clearance on 10 September, and made his debut as a 77th-minute substitute at Charlton two days later. He scored his first goal for the Saints in a 1–1 draw away to Carlisle United on 26 September; the 95th-minute goal came from a free kick which earned his side the draw. His first goal in the 2010–11 season came in a 4–1 victory over Huddersfield Town.

He retired at the end of the 2011–12 season, having failed to make a first team appearance as he struggled with injury but remained at Southampton in an international development role.

International career
Jaïdi was also a regular in the Tunisia line-up and was selected by coach Roger Lemerre for the 2006 World Cup. He scored the goal which secured a 2–2 draw in their opening game against Saudi Arabia. He had previously been part of Tunisia's 2004 African Nations Cup-winning squad, and played in the 2006 World Cup. He captained the Tunisian national team in the 2008 Africa Cup of Nations, where they went out in the quarter finals to Cameroon.

Coaching career

Following the culmination of his playing career at Southampton, Jaïdi became head coach of Southampton under-23’s.

In August 2019 he was linked with the vacant Tunisia national team manager job.

On 7 November 2019 American team Hartford Athletic announced that Jaidi has been named the club's head coach for the 2020 USL season, subject to the completion of relevant documentation. He said he hoped the job would allow him to return to coach in Europe in the future.

In February 2021, Jaidi was hired as an assistant coach for Belgian First Division A club Cercle Brugge until August 2021.

In August 2021, he joined his former club Espérance de Tunis as a head coach. On 25 September 2021, he won his first prize with his team by beating CS Sfaxien in the supercup. On 8 June 2022, he was sacked due to poor results after the elimination from Tunisian Cup against CS M'saken.

Personal life
Jaïdi is Muslim. He was born in Gabès, Tunisia. His mother raised him on her own after his father died when he was eleven years old.

Career statistics

International goals
Scores and results list Tunisia's goal tally first.

Honours

As player
ES Tunis
 Tunisian Ligue Professionnelle 1: 1993–94, 1997–98, 1998–99, 1999–2000, 2000–01, 2001–02, 2002–03, 2003–04
 Tunisian Cup: 1996–97, 1998–99
 Tunisian Super Cup: 2001
 CAF Champions League: 1994
 African Cup Winners' Cup: 1998
 CAF Cup: 1997
 CAF Super Cup: 1995
 Arab Super Cup: 1996

Southampton
 Football League Trophy: 2010

Tunisia
Africa Cup of Nations: 2004

As manager

ES Tunis
Tunisian Super Cup: 2021

See also
 List of men's footballers with 100 or more international caps

References

External links

Birmingham City profile
Southampton F.C. profile

1975 births
Living people
Footballers from Tunis
Association football defenders
Tunisian footballers
Tunisian Muslims
Tunisia international footballers
Espérance Sportive de Tunis players
Birmingham City F.C. players
Bolton Wanderers F.C. players
Southampton F.C. players
Premier League players
English Football League players
2002 FIFA World Cup players
2005 FIFA Confederations Cup players
2006 FIFA World Cup players
Footballers at the 1996 Summer Olympics
Olympic footballers of Tunisia
Tunisian expatriate footballers
Tunisian expatriate sportspeople in England
Expatriate footballers in England
2000 African Cup of Nations players
2002 African Cup of Nations players
2004 African Cup of Nations players
2006 Africa Cup of Nations players
2008 Africa Cup of Nations players
FIFA Century Club
Southampton F.C. non-playing staff
Hartford Athletic coaches
Tunisian football managers
Tunisian expatriate football managers
Expatriate soccer managers in the United States
Espérance Sportive de Tunis managers
Tunisian people of African descent